Salami Rural District is a rural district (dehestan) in Salami District, Khaf County, Razavi Khorasan province, Iran. At the 2006 census, its population was 7,324, in 1,469 families.  The rural district has 7 villages.

References 

Rural Districts of Razavi Khorasan Province
Khaf County